Central Police University (CPU) is a police academy located in Guishan District, Taoyuan City, Taiwan. CPU is the highest educational institution for police education in Taiwan. CPU is an administrative agency under the Ministry of the Interior of the Republic of China.

History
Established on 1 September 1936 in Maqun, Nanking as Central Police College by merging Police High School, MOI and Chechiang Provincial Police School. In 1937, the school college was moved to Danzhishi, Chungking due to the outbreak of the Second Sino-Japanese War. After the National Revolutionary Army won the war in 1945, the college was moved back to Nanking.

Due to the Chinese Civil War in 1949, the college was moved to Canton, then Chungking, and finally Taiwan where it was consolidated with Training Course for Police Officers in Taipei.

On 20 December 1995, the college was formally renamed Central Police University after approval was given by the Legislative Yuan on 12 December 1995.

List of presidents
Chiang Kai-shek (1 September 1936 – 1 October 1947)
 (李士珍)(1 October 1947 – February 1949)
Chen Yu-huei (陳玉輝) (February 1949 – June 1949)
Lee Chian (李騫) (July 1949 – June 1950)
 (樂幹)(October 1954 – April 1956)
 (趙龍文)(April 1956 – November 1966)
 (梅可望)(December 1966 – December 1973)
Lee Hsin-tang (李興唐) (December 1973 – April 1983)
 (周世斌) (April 1983 – May 1987)
 (顏世錫) (May 1987 – May 1995)
Yao Kao-chiao (May 1995 – June 1996)
Chen Bi (陳璧) (June 1996 – July 1997)
Hsieh Jui-chih (謝瑞智) (July 1997 – 9 August 2000)
Chu Cheng-ming (朱拯民) (10 August 2000 – August 2001)
Tsai Te-huei (蔡德輝) (August 2001 – March 2006)
Hsieh Ing-dan (March 2006 – 20 June 2008)
Hou You-yi (21 June 2008 – 24 December 2010)
Hsieh Hsiu-neng (謝秀能) (18 March 2011 – 16 January 2014)
Tiao Chien-sheng (刁建生) (16 January 2014 – 14 January 2019)
Chuang Te-sen (莊德森) (interim) (15 January 2019 – 12 February 2019)
Li Wen-ming (黎文明) (13 February 2019 – 15 January 2021)
Chen Che-wen（陳檡文）（15 January  2021-present)

Organizational structure
 Secretariat
 Department of Academic Affairs
 Department of Student Affairs
 Department of General Affairs
 Personnel Office
 Accounting and Statistics Office
 Public Relations Office
 Library and the World Police Museum
 Infirmary
 Forensic Science Laboratory
 Computer Center
 Extended Education Training Center
 Student Corps

Faculties
 College of Justice Administration
 College of Police Science and Technology
 General Education Center
 College of Fire Science
 College of Maritime Police

Notable alumni
 Chang Dongsheng, senior instructor in unarmed combat
 Henry Lee, forensic scientist
 Hou You-yi, Mayor of New Taipei (2018–)
 Huang Fu-yuan, Minister of Directorate-General of Personnel Administration (2012–2016)
 Tsao Erh-chung, member of Legislative Yuan (1993–2002, 2005–2012)
 Wang Ginn-wang, Minister of Coast Guard Administration (2006–2014)

See also
 Ministry of the Interior (Republic of China)
 List of universities in Taiwan
 World Police Museum
 Taiwan Police College

References

External links

 

 
1936 establishments in China
Taiwan